Genghis Khan is a 1987 Hong Kong television series based on the life of Genghis Khan, the founder of the Mongol Empire in the 13th century. The series was produced by ATV and released three months after a similarly titled television series was aired by ATV's rival TVB.

Cast

 Tony Liu as Genghis Khan / Yesügei
 Sun Xing as Jamukha
 Eva Lai as Börte
 Poon Sin-yi as Hoelun
 Berg Ng as Hasar
 Cheng Shu-fung as Belgutei
 Wai Lung as Daicha'er
 Philip Keung as Bo'orchu
 Simon Chui as Jelme
 Kwan Wai-lun as Muqali
 Chan Leung as Jebe
 Kwan Tze-biu as Chilaun
 Chan Sai-wah as Chenbai
 Yau Dai-pang as Bolewule
 Tang Tak-kwong as Hubilai
 Ling Mun-hoi as Menglike
 Ng Shing-fat as Jochi
 Fat Lit as Chagatai
 Cheung Wai as Ögedei
 Law Sung-wah as Tolui
 Wing Biu as Huo'erchi
 Cheng Lui as Taliehutai
 Choi Kwok-hing as Dexuechan
 Law Shek-ching as Wang Khan
 Lee Kong as Sangkun
 Ngo Lung as Suo'erhanshila
 Ling Fei-lik as Kuokuochu (witch doctor)
 Mang Lai-ping as Heda'an
 Siu San-yan as Sacha
 Fan Wing-wah as Bulibokuo
 Mun Lai-mui as Huozhen
 Ng Yiu-leung as Zha'erchi
 Cheung Tsang as Wang Jing
 Lo Chun-shun as Tayan Khan
 Leung Hon-wai as Fan Jicheng
 Keung Hon as Xin Qiji
 Paw Hon-lam as Lu You
 Keung To as Qiu Chuji
 Pat Poon as Yelü Chucai
 Ching Lam as Khulan
 Chun Wai-mun as Gu'erbiesu
 Lau Yuk-fung as Chiliedu
 Choi Man-yip as Suchi
 Chan Choi-yin as Yesui
 Tse Kwai-chi as Yesugan
 Chow Wai-kuen as Heida
 Yuen Ling-to as Kuokuochu (chariot driver)
 Law Man-ling as Kuokuochu (adopted son)

Asia Television original programming
1987 Hong Kong television series debuts
1987 Hong Kong television series endings
Television series set in the Mongol Empire
Depictions of Genghis Khan on television
1980s Hong Kong television series
Cantonese-language television shows